Utetheisa albipuncta is a moth in the family Erebidae. It was described by Druce in 1888. It is found on the Solomon Islands and the Bismarck Archipelago.

Subspecies
Utetheisa albipuncta albipuncta (Solomon Islands)
Utetheisa albipuncta zoilides Prout, 1920 (Bismarck Archipelago: Rook Island, New Britain and New Ireland)

References

Moths described in 1888
albipuncta